Carrie Cornplanter (1887–1918) was a Native American artist of the Seneca tribe.

Little is recorded of Cornplanter's life save that she was the elder sister of Jesse Cornplanter, had a sister named Anna, and had children of her own, and that her native name was "dédon". The three were descendants of Chief Cornplanter and the daughters of Edward Cornplanter. Carrie's paintings are among the earliest known by an American Indian woman to depict traditional aspects of native life. Most were created during the last decade of the 19th century or the first decade of the 20th, and she was thus at a relatively young age when she made the paintings. One such work, Indian Squaws Pounding Corn, is owned by the National Museum of the American Indian. Dating to around 1900, it was donated to the museum in 1922 by Joseph W. Keppler, a friend of the principal benefactor of the museum George Gustav Heye. Keppler likely purchased the piece directly from the artist or from a member of her family.

Carrie died in the 1918 flu pandemic. Her sister Anna and two of Carrie's daughters were the only members of the family other than Jesse to survive; the children were left destitute by the loss of their mother and were placed in Jesse's care when he returned home from World War I in Europe.

See also
List of Native American artists
List of Spanish flu cases

References

External links 
Indian Squaws Pounding Corn by Carrie Cornplanter, at the National Museum of the American Indian 
part 1-VOL XIII and Indian Cornhusk Dance by Carrie Cornplanter at the Smithsonian Institution. Artwork by brother Jesse Cornplanter on back. 

1887 births
1918 deaths
19th-century indigenous painters of the Americas
20th-century indigenous painters of the Americas
19th-century American painters
20th-century American painters
19th-century American women artists
20th-century American women artists
Seneca people
Schuyler family
[{Category:American people of Dutch descent]]
Native American painters
Native American women artists
Deaths from the Spanish flu pandemic in New York (state)